Józef Nowak (8 April 1925 – 16 January 1984) was a Polish actor. He appeared in more than 50 films and television shows between 1951 and 1980.

Selected filmography
 Warsaw Premiere (1951)
 Drugi brzeg (1962)
 Westerplatte (1967)
 Stawka większa niż życie (1967)

References

External links

1925 births
1984 deaths
People from Kraków County
Polish male film actors
Polish male stage actors
Recipients of the Order of Polonia Restituta
20th-century Polish male actors